USS Project (AM–278) was an  built for the United States Navy during World War II. She was decommissioned in 1947 after wartime service and transferred to the Philippine Navy in 1948 where she served under the name RPS Samar (M-33). She was stricken from the Philippine Navy in 1960; beyond that, her fate is not reported in secondary sources.

Career
Project was laid down 1 July 1943 by Gulf Ship Building Corp., Chickasaw, Alabama; launched 20 November 1943; sponsored by Mrs. Irene D. Jenkins; and commissioned 22 August 1944. Project departed U.S. Naval Repair Station, Algiers, Louisiana, 7 September for Little Creek, Virginia.

Project continued Atlantic Ocean coast operations during the first half of 1945 but in July proceeded via the Panama Canal Zone to San Pedro, California.  Engaging in minesweeping operations off California in August, the ship steamed to Pearl Harbor the 24th and on to Eniwetok and Saipan in September. After stopping at Buckner Bay, she reached Japan on the 20th. She remained in Japanese waters in connection with Japanese minesweeping activity and to make exploratory sweeps in the Omai Saki area.

Project was decommissioned, 13 June 1946 at Subic Bay, Philippines, and struck from the Naval Vessel Register on 16 September 1947. She was transferred to the Philippines on 24 May 1948 as RPS Samar (M-33). She was later reclassified as a patrol corvette with pennant number of PS-33. She was stricken in 1960. Her ultimate fate is not reported in secondary sources.

Awards 
Project received one battle star for U.S. World War II service.

References 
 
 NavSource Online: Mine Warfare Vessel Photo Archive - Project (AM 278)

Admirable-class minesweepers
Ships built in Chickasaw, Alabama
1943 ships
World War II minesweepers of the United States
Admirable-class minesweepers of the Philippine Navy
Miguel Malvar-class corvettes